CWSF may refer to:
 Central Washington State Fair, a state fair held in Yakima, Washington
 Canada-Wide Science Fair, a Canadian science fair
 Coal-water slurry fuel, a type of coal-based fuel